William Lewis Maury (1813 – November 27, 1878) was an American explorer and naval officer who served in the United States Navy for over 32 years, assisting Charles Wilkes' exploration of the Pacific Ocean and served in Matthew C. Perry's 1854 naval mission to Japan. Later he served as a Captain in the Confederate States Navy during the American Civil War.

Biography
William Lewis Maury was born in Virginia, the son of William Grymes Maury and Ann Hoomes Woolfolk, and became a midshipman in the United States Navy in 1829. Maury served in the United States Naval Observatory under his cousin, superintendent Matthew Fontaine Maury; in charting the seas, cartography, and in recording astronomical observations.

In the famed United States Exploring Expedition then Lieutenant Maury served under Charles Wilkes from 1838-1842. He served on the ships Vincennes; joined the Peacock at Orange Bay, and the Porpoise at Callao.

It was during the Exploring Expedition's survey of Puget Sound that Commodore Wilkes named Maury Island after William Lewis Maury. Maury continued in Navy service serving on the Navy Efficiency Board. In 1860 he served as a member of the Japanese Treaty Commission.

When the American Civil War began he resigned his commission and joined the Confederate States Navy. He was initially assigned to a coastal defense battery at Sewell's Point, Virginia. His talent for coastline defense was recognized early on and he was reassigned to the Confederate Torpedo Service. Serving first at Wilmington Station and Charlotte, North Carolina, he was soon transferred to Charleston Station. Later, as commander of the ship CSS Georgia, a commerce raider, he captured and sank several ships carrying war materials while letting others with commerce not for war go free.

Basic Pedigree for William Lewis Maury
Abraham Maury m. Marie Fourquuereau
Matthew Maury b.18 Sept. 1696, Gascony, France m. Mary Anne Fontaine
Rev James Maury m. Mary Walker
Walker Maury m. Mary Stith Grymes
William Grymes Maury m. Anne Holmes Woolfork
William Lewis Maury m. Anne Fontaine Maury (1832-1890)

Legacy
As a member of Wilkes' expedition, the Maury name was applied to a discovered feature of Puget Sound, Maury Island. In the 20th century, an ice-filled bay east of Cape Lewis, Antarctica, Maury Bay, was named after this explorer.

References

Sources

External links

1813 births
1878 deaths
People of Virginia in the American Civil War
United States Navy officers
Confederate States Navy captains
19th-century American naval officers
People from Caroline County, Virginia
Maury family of Virginia
People of the United States Exploring Expedition
American slave owners